The 2010 EuroHockey Club Champions Cup was the 37th edition of the premier women's European club championship. The tournament was held in two stages, spanning from 2 April–23 May 2010. The first stage was held in Berlin, Germany, and the second in Amsterdam, Netherlands.

Den Bosch won the tournament for the eleventh time, defeating Hamburg 3–0 in the final. Amsterdam finished in third place after defeating Atasport 2–1 in the third place playoff.

Teams
The following twelve teams participated in the tournament:

 Atasport
 Bowdon Hightown
 Olton & West Warwickshire
 Berliner (host club)
 Hamburg
 Amsterdam (host club)
 Den Bosch
 Sumchanka
 Volga
 Grove Menzieshill
 Club de Campo
 Club de Polo

Format
The twelve teams were divided into pools of three. In each pool, teams competed in a single round-robin format. At the conclusion of the pool stage, the top two teams of each pool moved forward to the Quarter-finals, while the bottom teams moved on to classification matches. The losing Quarter-finalists were eliminated, whole the winners moved on the Semi-finals and subsequent medal matches.

Results

Preliminary round

Pool A

Pool B

Pool C

Pool D

Classification round

Ninth to twelfth place classification

First to eighth place classification

Quarter-finals

Semi-finals

Third and fourth place

Final

Statistics

Final standings

Goalscorers

References

2010
2010 in women's field hockey
2009–10 in European field hockey